The  was the fourth season of the Japan Football League, the third tier of the Japanese football league system.

Overview 

It was contested by 18 teams, and Honda FC won the championship.

Table

Results

Top scorers

Attendances

Promotion and relegation 
After the season, Alouette Kumamoto and Profesor Miyazaki were automatically relegated to Kyūshū regional league. Due to contraction of the league, the winners and runners-up of the Regional League promotion series, Ain Food and SP Kyoto, were set to compete in the promotion and relegation series with 16th and 15th placed teams – Jatco SC and Shizuoka Sangyo University respectively.

Leg 1

Series tied 2–2. Jatco F.C. won the series 4–2 in penalty shootout and stayed in JFL.

Leg 2

Series tied 0–0. Sagawa Printing won the series 5–3 in penalty shootout and earned promotion to JFL. Shizuoka Sangyo University were relegated to Tōkai regional league.

References 

2002
3